The year 1868 in archaeology involved some significant events.

Explorations

Excavations
 Charles Warren starts first excavations of Jericho.
 Grime's Graves in the English county of  Norfolk is excavated in 1868-1870, including Gallery III2b of Greenwell's Pit.
 The Mammen excavation, a Viking Age site near Viborg in Jutland (Denmark) is excavated.
 At Les Eyzies, France, a cave site is excavated containing Cro-Magnon remains, at the end of La Rue du Scez overlooking Le Havre du Scez (Saie).
 At Nymphaeum (a Greek colony in the Crimea), a burial site is excavated, with six Scythian tombs.
 In Greece, philologist Spyridon Findiklis and his assistant Ioannis Papadakis begin the first excavations in Thebes and Plataea.
 Alfred Biliotti starts excavations at Ialysos on Rhodes.

Finds
 The Mesha Stele is found.
 At Rome, the remains of the Porta Capena are found.
 At Les Eyzies, France, alongside the Cro-Magnon remains, numerous flint tools of Aurignacian manufacture are found.
 Hildesheim Treasure is found.
 The first Shapwick hoard of Roman coins is found in England.

Publications

Births
January 3: Franz Cumont, Belgian archaeologist and historian (died 1947)
March 15: Albert Lythgoe, American Egyptologist, curator of the New York Metropolitan Museum (died 1934)
July 14: Gertrude Bell, British archaeologist (died 1926)

Deaths
September 10: Jacques Boucher de Crèvecœur de Perthes, French archaeologist (born 1788)

See also
 Neanderthal man

References

Archaeology
Archaeology by year
Archaeology
Archaeology